9-Anthracenemethanol is the derivative of anthracene with a hydroxymethyl group (CH2OH) attached to the 9-position.  It is a colorless solid that is soluble in ordinary organic solvents.  The compound can be prepared by hydrogenation of 9-anthracenecarboxaldehyde. It is a versatile precursor to supramolecular assemblies.

References

Alcohols
Anthracenes